James Coats was a British skeleton racer and baronet.

James Coats or Coates may also refer to:

Sir James Coats, 1st Baronet (1834–1913), of the Coats baronets
James B. Coats, Baptist minister and songwriter elected to the Gospel Music Hall of Fame
Jim Coates (1932–2019), former United States Major League Baseball pitcher
James Coates (banker) (1851–1935), New Zealand sportsman and banker
James Coates (parliamentary official) (1815–1854), parliamentary official and pioneer of Auckland, New Zealand
James Coates, American minister and member of the Council of the District of Columbia
James Coates (British Army officer) (1740–1822)
James Henry Coates, America Union Army officer
Jim Coats, Australian cricketer
Jim Coates, American baseball pitcher

See also
Jimmy Coates, a series of children's books 
Coats (surname)